Kieninger is a German surname. Notable people with the surname include:

Georg Kieninger (1902–1975), German chess player
Gerda Kieninger (1951–2020), German politician
Ludwig Kieninger, German sculptor

German-language surnames